Easton is a town in Bristol County, Massachusetts, United States. The population was 25,058 at the 2020 census. It is part of the Greater Boston area.

Easton is governed by an elected Select Board. Open Town Meeting acts as the legislative branch of the town. The Select Board chooses a Town Administrator to run the day-to-day operations of the town.

History

Easton was first settled in 1694 and was officially incorporated in 1725.

In 1694, the first settler, Clement Briggs, established his home near the Easton Green. In 1711, the Taunton North Purchase area became Norton, and in 1713, the sixty-nine families settled in Easton and hired Elder William Pratt as their first minister. Prior to the settlers' establishment, the area was occupied by Native Americans as a hunting area and a burial ground. During King Philip's War, Metacom, also known as King Philip, used part of Easton as a headquarters for his troops. There was no legal parish in Easton until 1722, when the East Precinct of Norton was recognized. In 1725, the area was incorporated as the Town of Easton; it was so named because it was formerly called the "East End" of the Taunton North Purchase and was shortened by pronunciation to Easton. During the Revolutionary War, General George Washington stayed at the Benjamin Williams Tavern on Bay Road, which is now the second oldest existing house in Easton, while on his way to negotiate for cannonballs at the old Perry Foundry in Taunton.

In 1803, the Ames Shovel Works was established and became nationally known as having provided the shovels which laid the Union Pacific Railroad and opened the west. In 1875, the shovel production of the Ames plant was worth $1.5 million. The most notable of the Ames family were Oakes Ames, a key figure in the Crédit Mobilier of America scandal, and Oliver Ames(R), governor of Massachusetts from 1887–1890.

The Ames family shaped the town's economy, and was responsible for the presence of a number of landmark buildings in the town designed by H. H. Richardson, originator of the Richardsonian Romanesque style and designer of Trinity Church in Boston.

Richardson buildings in Easton include:

The Ames Free Library (town library)
Oakes Ames Memorial Hall
The Old Colony Railroad Station (houses the Easton Historical Society)
The Ames Gate Lodge (privately owned by the Ames family)
The F. L. Ames Gardener's Cottage (privately owned by the Ames family)

Though this school complex was not made by Richardson himself, it was dedicated to him and made in his style:
H.H.Richardson/F.L.Olmsted Intermediate School

In addition, there is a commercial building at 69 Main Street which was designed and built in the nineteenth century by Richardson's office in a Richardsonian style. The Richardson buildings are all located within a compact area designated as the H. H. Richardson Historic District. The area also includes The Rockery, designed by Frederick Law Olmsted, who also landscaped grounds of Oakes Ames Memorial Hall and the Ames Free Library.

Within a few blocks of the H. H. Richardson Historic District is Unity Church, built by the Ames family in 1875, and designed in the Gothic Revival Style by architect and publisher John Ames Mitchell. It includes an ornate oak frieze including sculptures of twenty-two angels playing music, carved by Johannes Kirchmayer (1860–1930), and two notable stained-glass windows, "Angel of Help," and "Figure of Wisdom," both by John LaFarge (1835–1910). "Figure of Wisdom," completed in 1901, is the largest stained-glass work created by LaFarge.

Geography

The town, in addition to its own smaller town forest, includes part of Borderland State Park at the northwest corner of town, Hockomock Swamp Wildlife Management Area at the southeast corner of town, and all of Wheaton Farm Conservation Area in the southwest. All of the town's waterways are considered part of the Taunton River Watershed area, which in turn is the eastern section of the Narragansett Bay Watershed area.

Easton forms the northeastern corner of Bristol County, where the county intersects with Plymouth County to the east and Norfolk County to the north.

The localities of Easton include Alger's Corner, Daley Corner, Easton Center, Easton Green, Eastondale, Five Corners, Furnace Village, Goward's Corner, Morris Corner, Morse Corner, Pratt's Corner. Although there is no official designation dividing "North Easton" from "South Easton," the terms are colloquially used by older residents of the town even though they have no governmental or legal standing.

Easton is located in eastern Massachusetts. The roughly trapezoidal-shaped town is bordered by Brockton and West Bridgewater to the east, Taunton and Raynham to the south, Norton to either side of its southwest corner, Mansfield to the west, and Sharon and Stoughton to the north.

Demography

As of the census of 2000, there were 22,299 people, 7,489 households, and 5,571 families residing in the town. The racial makeup of the town was 91.94% White, 1.59% African American, 0.04% Native American, 1.39% Asian, 0.01% Pacific Islander, 4.13% from other races, and 0.91% from two or more races. Hispanic or Latino of any race were 1.58% of the population.

There were 7,489 households, out of which 37.4% had children under the age of 18 living with them, 62.3% were married couples living together, 8.9% had a female householder with no husband present, and 25.6% were non-families. 20.7% of all households were made up of individuals, and 6.9% had someone living alone who was 65 years of age or older.  The average household size was 2.74 and the average family size was 3.21.

In the town, the population was spread out, with 24.4% under the age of 18, 13.1% from 18 to 24, 28.7% from 25 to 44, 24.3% from 45 to 64, and 9.4% who were 65 years of age or older.  The median age was 36 years. For every 100 females, there were 94.6 males.  For every 100 females age 18 and over, there were 91.1 males.

The median income for a household in the town was $89,144, and the median income for a family was $112,190. Males had a median income of $51,429 versus $35,912 for females. The per capita income for the town was $40,732.  About 0.7% of families and 2.0% of the population were below the poverty line, including 0.6% of those under age 18 and 6.5% of those age 65 or over.

Education

Public schools

Easton's public school system includes three early-elementary schools serving kindergarten through second grade: Moreau Hall, Parkview School, and Center School; there are two elementary schools serving grades 3–5: Frederick Law Olmsted School and Henry Hobson Richardson School  (now considered one school, known as "Richardson-Olmsted.");  meanwhile grades 6 through 8 attend Easton Middle School, and high school students attend Oliver Ames High School (OA). The three early elementary schools will be combined into one new school set to open in the Winter of 2022.

Oliver Ames High School's athletic teams' mascot is the tiger. The school colors are orange and black.  The OA girls varsity basketball team won the Division II state basketball championship in 2006 and 2010.  The Oliver Ames Varsity Baseball team won the Division II State Baseball Championship in June 2007.  In November 2007 Oliver Ames girl's varsity soccer team won the Division II state soccer championship. In November 2015 the Oliver Ames boys soccer team won the state championship game. The high school also boasts an impressive music department, complete with a jazz band, marching band, concert band, show choir, concert choir and chamber orchestra. The Oliver Ames Marching Band won the 2008 Division 2 New England championships for USSBA, and placed 5th out of 29 bands competing.

The town is also home to Southeastern Regional Vocational Technical High School, which serves all the bordering towns (except Taunton and Raynham), plus Foxborough. Students may choose to attend Southeastern or Oliver Ames free of charge.

Higher education

Easton is home to Stonehill College, a private, non-profit, coeducational, Roman Catholic, liberal arts college. Their mascot is "Ace" the Skyhawk.

Transportation
Easton is served by the following highways that run through the town: Routes 106, 123 and 138. Additionally, the town is served by two major highways which run just outside its border, Route 24 to the east and Interstate 495 to the south.

Easton receives limited bus service from the Brockton Area Transit Authority, with Route 9 making stops adjacent to Stonehill College and the Easton Industrial Park. Bloom Bus Lines also offers commuter bus service to Taunton and Boston, with a flag stop at the corner of Route 138 and Route 106.

Easton is the site of two proposed MBTA Commuter Rail stations, North Easton and Easton Village, on the Stoughton Branch option of the MBTA's South Coast Rail project. In March 2011, following the release of the U.S. Army Corps of Engineers' Draft Environmental Impact Report, Gov. Deval Patrick's administration and the MBTA announced this alternative as the best option for achieving all the goals of the project. As of 2019, the Easton stations have been moved to Phase 2 of the project, which will not be completed until 2030.

Points of interest
 Ames Free Library
 Borderland State Park
 Oakes Ames Memorial Hall
 Stonehill College
 The Rockery
Governor Oliver Ames Estate

Notable people

Athletes

 Jim Craig, goaltender for the gold medal winning 1980 "Miracle on Ice" U.S. Olympic hockey team
 Corey Dillon, former NFL player lived in Easton while playing for the New England Patriots
 Irving Fryar, lived in Easton while playing for the New England Patriots
 Scott Gordon, former US Olympic and NHL hockey goalie, AHL and NHL coach
 Nick Green (baseball), lived in Easton while playing for the Boston Red Sox
 Russ Hochstein, lived in Easton while playing for the New England Patriots
 Cedric Jones (wide receiver), lived in Easton while playing for the New England Patriots
 Ronnie Lippett, former New England Patriots player who still lives in Easton
 Stanley Morgan, former New England Patriots player lived in Easton
 Andre Tippett, lived in Easton for a part of his career
 Mo Vaughn, former Boston Red Sox player lived in Easton
 Erik Vendt, 3 time Olympic Medalist for swimming (2 silver, 1 gold) 2000, 2004, 2008 Olympics
 Mike Vrabel, former NFL player lived in Easton while playing for the New England Patriots
 Brent Williams (American football), former New England Patriots player lives in Easton
 John Marino, NHL Defenseman for the New Jersey Devils
 David MacKinnon, MLB First Baseman who has spent time on the Los Angeles Angels and Oakland Athletics

Historical

 Blanche Ames Ames, Inventor/painter, suffragette, and first president of the Birth Control League of Massachusetts. Maiden name was Ames, married Oakes Ames (below) and kept both names, although no relation until married
 Oakes Ames (1804–1873), manufacturer, United States Congressman
 Oakes Ames (botanist), specialist in orchids
 Oliver Ames, Sr. (1779–1863)
 Oliver Ames, Jr. (1807–1877), president of the Union Pacific railroad
 Frederick Lothrop Ames (1835–1893), Vice President of the Old Colony Railroad and director of the Union Pacific railroad
 Frederick Lothrop Ames, Jr. (1876–1921), Son of Frederick Lothrop Ames
 Ruth Graves Wakefield, Creator of the chocolate chip cookie; was born in Easton

Writers

 Joseph Nassise, Internationally Best-Selling Writer
 Alaina Urquhart-White, NYT Best Selling Author

Politicians

 Oliver Ames (1831–1895), governor of Massachusetts
 George Van Ness Lothrop (1817–1897), Michigan Attorney General
 Martin V. Pratt (1828–1898), Wisconsin State Assemblyman
 Claire Cronin, 25th United States Ambassador to Ireland, and former Majority Leader of the Massachusetts House of Representatives

Actors

 Kristian Alfonso, soap opera star

Government

Easton is represented by Claire Cronin (D) and Carol Doherty (D) in the Massachusetts House of Representatives.

Easton is represented by Walter Timilty (D) and Michael Brady (D) in the Massachusetts Senate.

Easton is represented by Elizabeth Warren (D) and Ed Markey (D) in the United States Senate.

In the United States Congress Easton is represented by Jake Auchincloss (D).

Local government
Easton is governed by an elected committee of select board members and a town administrator. Easton's "Board of Selectmen" was renamed a Select Board via Town Meeting in 2019.

The Easton Select Board:

Dottie Fulginiti (Chair)
Craig Barger (Vice-Chair)
Marc Lamb
Thomas Brussard
Charles King

The Easton Town Administrator:

 Connor Read

Media
Easton does not have a daily newspaper, but is served by the Brockton Enterprise, a GateHouse Media company. Easton's last town-specific newspaper, a weekly called the Easton Journal, published its final issue in 2019, combining with three other local weekly newspapers to create a regional weekly called the Journal News Independent (also owned by GateHouse Media).

Easton Community Access Television serves as the public access station for the town, with many town board meetings and school events televised on the channel. Because of Easton's proximity to both Boston and Providence, town residents have access to television networks in both media markets.

Religion
Easton has 13 houses of worship, including two Baptist churches, two Catholic churches, two Congregational churches, and two Jewish temples.

References

External links

 Easton Official Website
History of the Town of Easton by William L. Chaffin

 
Towns in Bristol County, Massachusetts
Populated places established in 1694
1694 establishments in Massachusetts
Providence metropolitan area
Towns in Massachusetts